The Stary Oskol constituency (No.76) is a Russian legislative constituency in Belgorod Oblast. The constituency covers eastern Belgorod Oblast.

Members elected

Election results

1993

|-
! colspan=2 style="background-color:#E9E9E9;text-align:left;vertical-align:top;" |Candidate
! style="background-color:#E9E9E9;text-align:left;vertical-align:top;" |Party
! style="background-color:#E9E9E9;text-align:right;" |Votes
! style="background-color:#E9E9E9;text-align:right;" |%
|-
|style="background-color:"|
|align=left|Boris Zamay
|align=left|Independent
|
|21.46%
|-
|style="background-color:#EA3C38"|
|align=left|Oleg Polukhin
|align=left|Civic Union
| -
|19.53%
|-
| colspan="5" style="background-color:#E9E9E9;"|
|- style="font-weight:bold"
| colspan="3" style="text-align:left;" | Total
| 
| 100%
|-
| colspan="5" style="background-color:#E9E9E9;"|
|- style="font-weight:bold"
| colspan="4" |Source:
|
|}

1995

|-
! colspan=2 style="background-color:#E9E9E9;text-align:left;vertical-align:top;" |Candidate
! style="background-color:#E9E9E9;text-align:left;vertical-align:top;" |Party
! style="background-color:#E9E9E9;text-align:right;" |Votes
! style="background-color:#E9E9E9;text-align:right;" |%
|-
|style="background-color:"|
|align=left|Oleg Kuleshov
|align=left|Communist Party
|
|29.62%
|-
|style="background-color:"|
|align=left|Boris Zamay (incumbent)
|align=left|Independent
|
|16.11%
|-
|style="background-color:"|
|align=left|Yury Selivyorstov
|align=left|Independent
|
|14.30%
|-
|style="background-color:"|
|align=left|Valery Varganov
|align=left|Our Home – Russia
|
|12.68%
|-
|style="background-color:"|
|align=left|Sergey Sychyov
|align=left|Liberal Democratic Party
|
|10.15%
|-
|style="background-color:#DA2021"|
|align=left|Anatoly Kashpirovsky
|align=left|Ivan Rybkin Bloc
|
|5.39%
|-
|style="background-color:"|
|align=left|Nikolay Chuprina
|align=left|Agrarian Party
|
|5.18%
|-
|style="background-color:#000000"|
|colspan=2 |against all
|
|5.33%
|-
| colspan="5" style="background-color:#E9E9E9;"|
|- style="font-weight:bold"
| colspan="3" style="text-align:left;" | Total
| 
| 100%
|-
| colspan="5" style="background-color:#E9E9E9;"|
|- style="font-weight:bold"
| colspan="4" |Source:
|
|}

1999

|-
! colspan=2 style="background-color:#E9E9E9;text-align:left;vertical-align:top;" |Candidate
! style="background-color:#E9E9E9;text-align:left;vertical-align:top;" |Party
! style="background-color:#E9E9E9;text-align:right;" |Votes
! style="background-color:#E9E9E9;text-align:right;" |%
|-
|style="background-color:"|
|align=left|Andrey Skoch
|align=left|Independent
|
|53.24%
|-
|style="background-color:"|
|align=left|Fyodor Ladygin
|align=left|Independent
|
|12.70%
|-
|style="background-color:"|
|align=left|Aleksandr Goncharov
|align=left|Unity
|
|8.33%
|-
|style="background-color:"|
|align=left|Vladimir Averin
|align=left|Kedr
|
|5.39%
|-
|style="background-color:"|
|align=left|Boris Zamay
|align=left|Independent
|
|3.74%
|-
|style="background:"| 
|align=left|Valery Kirpichnikov
|align=left|Yabloko
|
|2.66%
|-
|style="background-color:#000000"|
|colspan=2 |against all
|
|11.39%
|-
| colspan="5" style="background-color:#E9E9E9;"|
|- style="font-weight:bold"
| colspan="3" style="text-align:left;" | Total
| 
| 100%
|-
| colspan="5" style="background-color:#E9E9E9;"|
|- style="font-weight:bold"
| colspan="4" |Source:
|
|}

2003

|-
! colspan=2 style="background-color:#E9E9E9;text-align:left;vertical-align:top;" |Candidate
! style="background-color:#E9E9E9;text-align:left;vertical-align:top;" |Party
! style="background-color:#E9E9E9;text-align:right;" |Votes
! style="background-color:#E9E9E9;text-align:right;" |%
|-
|style="background-color:"|
|align=left|Andrey Skoch (incumbent)
|align=left|Independent
|
|71.68%
|-
|style="background-color:"|
|align=left|Oleg Kuleshov
|align=left|Communist Party
|
|12.50%
|-
|style="background-color:"|
|align=left|Vladimir Usachev
|align=left|Liberal Democratic Party
|
|2.26%
|-
|style="background-color:"|
|align=left|Yury Ruda
|align=left|Independent
|
|1.24%
|-
|style="background-color:"|
|align=left|Nikolay Naydenov
|align=left|Independent
|
|1.08%
|-
|style="background-color:#164C8C"|
|align=left|Vyacheslav Panov
|align=left|United Russian Party Rus'
|
|0.99%
|-
|style="background-color:#000000"|
|colspan=2 |against all
|
|8.85%
|-
| colspan="5" style="background-color:#E9E9E9;"|
|- style="font-weight:bold"
| colspan="3" style="text-align:left;" | Total
| 
| 100%
|-
| colspan="5" style="background-color:#E9E9E9;"|
|- style="font-weight:bold"
| colspan="4" |Source:
|
|}

2016

|-
! colspan=2 style="background-color:#E9E9E9;text-align:left;vertical-align:top;" |Candidate
! style="background-color:#E9E9E9;text-align:leftt;vertical-align:top;" |Party
! style="background-color:#E9E9E9;text-align:right;" |Votes
! style="background-color:#E9E9E9;text-align:right;" |%
|-
| style="background-color: " |
|align=left|Andrey Skoch
|align=left|United Russia
|
|72.96%
|-
|style="background-color:"|
|align=left|Stanislav Panov
|align=left|Communist Party
|
|9.51%
|-
|style="background-color:"|
|align=left|Konstantin Klimashevsky
|align=left|Liberal Democratic Party
|
|5.43%
|-
|style="background-color:"|
|align=left|Sergey Bocharnikov
|align=left|A Just Russia
|
|5.03%
|-
|style="background:"| 
|align=left|Dmitry Fedorchenko
|align=left|Communists of Russia
|
|2.05%
|-
|style="background-color:"|
|align=left|Valery Borisovsky
|align=left|Independent
|
|1.40%
|-
|style="background-color:"|
|align=left|Aleksandr Sobolev
|align=left|Rodina
|
|0.93%
|-
|style="background:"| 
|align=left|Andrey Maysak
|align=left|Civic Platform
|
|0.72%
|-
| colspan="5" style="background-color:#E9E9E9;"|
|- style="font-weight:bold"
| colspan="3" style="text-align:left;" | Total
| 
| 100%
|-
| colspan="5" style="background-color:#E9E9E9;"|
|- style="font-weight:bold"
| colspan="4" |Source:
|
|}

2021

|-
! colspan=2 style="background-color:#E9E9E9;text-align:left;vertical-align:top;" |Candidate
! style="background-color:#E9E9E9;text-align:left;vertical-align:top;" |Party
! style="background-color:#E9E9E9;text-align:right;" |Votes
! style="background-color:#E9E9E9;text-align:right;" |%
|-
|style="background-color: " |
|align=left|Andrey Skoch (incumbent)
|align=left|United Russia
|
|63.90%
|-
|style="background-color:"|
|align=left|Nikolay Mishustin
|align=left|Communist Party
|
|16.17%
|-
|style="background-color:"|
|align=left|Oleg Korchagin
|align=left|A Just Russia — For Truth
|
|4.32%
|-
|style="background-color: "|
|align=left|Georgy Zaytsev
|align=left|New People
|
|3.23%
|-
|style="background-color:"|
|align=left|Konstantin Klimashevsky
|align=left|Liberal Democratic Party
|
|2.91%
|-
|style="background-color: "|
|align=left|Andrey Kolosov
|align=left|Party of Pensioners
|
|2.69%
|-
|style="background-color: "|
|align=left|Artyom Goncharov
|align=left|Russian Party of Freedom and Justice
|
|2.45%
|-
|style="background-color:"|
|align=left|Andrey Drozdov
|align=left|The Greens
|
|1.21%
|-
|style="background-color:"|
|align=left|Aleksandr Yeskov
|align=left|Rodina
|
|0.98%
|-
| colspan="5" style="background-color:#E9E9E9;"|
|- style="font-weight:bold"
| colspan="3" style="text-align:left;" | Total
| 
| 100%
|-
| colspan="5" style="background-color:#E9E9E9;"|
|- style="font-weight:bold"
| colspan="4" |Source:
|
|}

Notes

References

Russian legislative constituencies
Politics of Belgorod Oblast